"I Am a Pig" is a song by American industrial metal band 2wo. The song was released as the lead single from the band's only album, Voyeurs.

Music video
A music video was produced for the song, being directed by porn director Chi Chi LaRue. The video takes place in a brothel and features grainy S&M scenes with several people in leather–clad outfits. The video features various porn stars, including Janine Lindemulder and Tom Chase. The video ends with Rob Halford in a pose similar to the one on the album's cover, with the word Voyeurs appearing over his face. The video was not widely shown due to its content, but it was not banned. The video is briefly featured in the 1999 black comedy film Idle Hands.

Track listing

Charts

Personnel
 Rob Halford – vocals
 John 5 – guitar, bass
 Bob Marlette – keyboards, drum programming, bass
 Phil Western – keyboards, drum programming
 Anthony "Fu" Valcic – keyboards, drum programming

References

1998 songs
1998 singles
Nothing Records singles
Songs written by Rob Halford
Songs written by John 5
Songs written by Bob Marlette
Song recordings produced by Bob Marlette